Jorge Gallent (born June 18, 1968) is a Filipino professional basketball coach and former player. He is the head coach for the San Miguel Beermen of the Philippine Basketball Association (PBA).

University Athletic Association of the Philippines
Gallent participated in the University Athletic Association of the Philippines for the FEU Tamaraws Men's Basketball team but it ended as the result of a motorcycle accident and lost his right eye in 1988 in Alabang Hills. He then shifted into non contact sports and became a topnotch junior golfer.

Development league
In the Philippine Basketball League, Gallent saw action for the A&W Root Beer team in 1992. He was also part of the Stag Pale Pilsen grandslam team. He would serve as an assistant coach to the Welcoat Paintmasters. His head coaching break came with Harbour Centre Batang Pier as a replacement for Dindo Pumaren. He guided the team into winning 6 titles.

PBA career
Gallent played briefly for the Tanduay Rhum Masters during the 1999 PBA season under Alfrancis Chua. He started his PBA coaching profession as the Air21 Express assistant of Yeng Guiao during the professional league's 34th season. He then transferred to B-Meg Derby Ace Llamados the same season as part of the coaching staff of Ryan Gregorio. Gallent was eventually selected as the Llamados head coach with Gregorio's departure to the Meralco Bolts at the end of 2009–10 PBA season.

2010–11 Rookie head coach
B-Meg Derby Ace Llamados started the 2010–11 PBA season without three starters Kerby Raymundo, Marc Pingris and Rafi Reavis because of injuries. While star player James Yap slowly recovered from a nose operation which led to 3-straight loses for Gallent's team. Gallent's first win as head coach came against former coach Ryan Gregorio with a 75–71 conquest of Meralco Bolts.

Under Gallent's watch, The Llamados recovered and streaked to consecutive wins in the elimination round with vastly improved plays, showcasing their talent and cohesion even without the injured frontliners.

In the middle of 2023 PBA Commissioner's Cup, Gallent was appointed as San Miguel Beermen's interim coach, while Leo Austria was restricted for medical reasons. He guided the team to sweep the last four games of the elimination round and sweeping the quarterfinals. He returned as assistant coach when Austria returned. He was officially appointed as team's head coach for the next conference.

Coaching record

Collegiate record

Professional record

External links
 Purefoods Basketball – Current News and Updates

References

1968 births
Living people
Filipino men's basketball coaches
Filipino men's basketball players
Barako Bull Energy coaches
Place of birth missing (living people)
FEU Tamaraws basketball players
Tanduay Rhum Masters players
Magnolia Hotshots coaches
San Miguel Beermen coaches
San Sebastian Stags basketball coaches